The PCT Newsletter is a monthly publication of the World Intellectual Property Organization (WIPO). It contains "up-to-date news about the Patent Cooperation Treaty (PCT)", which provides a system for filing international (patent) applications. The PCT Newsletter is published in English only. Important changes to the PCT are mentioned and explained in the PCT Newsletter.

The first issue of the PCT Newsletter was published in March 1994 on a subscription basis. Since January 1997, the issues are published online, free of charge. Since January 2008, the PCT Newsletter is available only online, and no longer as a paper publication.

See also 
 Official Journal of the European Patent Office
 List of intellectual property law journals

References

External links 
 PCT Newsletters since 1994 available online on the WIPO web site
 

Newsletter
Newsletters
Publications established in 1994
Works about patent law